The Wedding March may refer to:

"Wedding March" (Mendelssohn), an 1842 composition by Felix Mendelssohn from his incidental music for A Midsummer Night's Dream
The Wedding March, an 1873 play by W. S. Gilbert, later adapted as the comic opera Haste to the Wedding
The Wedding March (1915 film), an Italian silent film directed by Carmine Gallone
The Wedding March (1928 film), an American silent film directed by Erich von Stroheim
The Wedding March (1929 film), a French silent film directed by André Hugon 
The Wedding March (1934 film), an Italian comedy film
The Wedding March (film series), a 2016–2019 American-Canadian romantic film series

See also 
"Bridal Chorus", from the 1850 opera Lohengrin by Richard Wagner, frequently used as a wedding march
Wedding music